The 2016 American Athletic Conference men's basketball tournament was the conference tournament for the American Athletic Conference during the 2015–16 NCAA Division I men's basketball season. It was held March 10–13, 2016, at the Amway Center in Orlando, Florida. The Tournament was won by the #5 Seed Connecticut Huskies, who beat the #6 Seed Memphis Tigers in the final by a score of 72–58.

Seeds
Teams are seeded by conference record, with a ties broken by record between the tied teams followed by record against the regular-season champion, if necessary. With SMU ineligible for postseason play, the top six seeds will receive first round byes.

Schedule

All tournament games are nationally televised on an ESPN network:

Bracket

* denotes overtime period

References

American Athletic Conference men's basketball tournament
2015–16 American Athletic Conference men's basketball season
Basketball competitions in Orlando, Florida
College sports tournaments in Florida
2016 in sports in Florida